The 2018 Caribbean Series (Serie del Caribe) was the 60th edition of the international competition featuring the champions of the Cuban National Series, Dominican Professional Baseball League, Mexican Pacific League, Puerto Rican Professional Baseball League, and Venezuelan Professional Baseball League. It took place from February 2 to 8, 2018 at the Estadio Panamericano in Guadalajara, Mexico.  Criollos de Caguas of Puerto Rico won the tournament.  

The series was originally set to be hosted in Barquisimeto, Venezuela, but due to the socioeconomic crisis at the time it had to be moved to Mexico for a second consecutive year.

Stadium
The Estadio Panamericano is located in Zapopan, within the Guadalajara Metropolitan Area. It is currently home to the Charros de Jalisco of the Mexican Pacific League, who have played there since their entry to the league for the 2014-15 season.

Format
The Preliminary Round consisted of a ten-game round robin, after which the top 4 teams advanced to the Semifinal Round (1st vs. 4th, 2nd vs. 3rd). The winners of the semifinal games then squared off in the Final.

Participating teams

Preliminary round

Time zone: Mexican Central Time (UTC–6)

Knockout stage

Semi-finals

Final

References

External links
Caribbean Series on mlb.com

Caribbean
2018 in Caribbean sport
Caribbean Series
2018
Caribbean Series
International baseball competitions hosted by Mexico